The Nimrud Slab, also known as the Calah Orthostat Slab, is the top half of a "summary inscription" of the reign of Adad-nirari III (811 to 783 BC) discovered in 1854 in by William Loftus in his excavations at Nimrud on behalf of the Assyrian Excavation Fund.

It is the best known of the inscriptions of Adad-nirari III, since it includes a description of early Assyrian conquests in Syria and Palestine.

The inscription was carved on a gypsum slab, and the surviving part of the inscription is thought to represent the top half of the original slab. The original slab is lost after it was thought to have been left behind in Nimrud. However, a squeeze was taken by Edwin Norris, which allowed the text to be published by Rawlinson.

The text as translated by Luckenbill as below:

[I subdued] from the bank of the Euphrates, the land of Hatti, the land of Amurru in its entirety, the land of Tyre, the land of Sidon, the land of Humri, the land of Edom, the land of Palastu, as far as the great sea of the setting sun.  I imposed tax and tribute on them.

See also 

 Saba'a Stele
 Tell al-Rimah stela

External links
 COS 2, 276, 2.114G
 The Assyrian Eponym Canon, George Smith, 1875, page 115

References

9th-century BC inscriptions
8th-century BC inscriptions
1854 archaeological discoveries
Assyrian inscriptions
Philistia
Slab